Yves Vladislav (born 12 May 1998) is a Swiss footballer playing as a midfielder for Serbian side OFK Beograd.

Born in Allschwil, Vladislav begin playing in Switzerland with the youth teams of Allschwil and Basel. In summer 2016 he joined Scottish side Heart of Midlothian. He made two appearances for Hearts U-20 in the 2016–17 Scottish Challenge Cup. During the winter-break he moved to Serbia and joined the youth-team of FK Partizan´s satellite club Teleoptik. In the following season he joined the first-team, but failed to debut in the league. In summer 2018 he moved to another Serbian club, second-level side Sinđelić Beograd. With Sinđelić he debuted in the 2018–19 Serbian First League.

Career statistics

Club

Notes

References

1998 births
Living people
Swiss men's footballers
Swiss expatriate footballers
Association football midfielders
Serbian First League players
FC Basel players
Heart of Midlothian F.C. players
FK Teleoptik players
FK Sinđelić Beograd players
OFK Beograd players
Swiss expatriate sportspeople in Scotland
Expatriate footballers in Scotland
Swiss expatriate sportspeople in Serbia
Expatriate footballers in Serbia